The 2012–13 Lega Pro Seconda Divisione season was the thirty-fifth football league season of Italian Lega Pro Seconda Divisione since its establishment in 1978, and the fifth since the renaming from Serie C to Lega Pro.

It will be divided into two phases: the regular season, and the playoff phase.

The league currently would be composed of 36 teams divided into two divisions (Girone A and B) divided geographically, with the exception of the Sicilian team Milazzo that plays in group A, each composed of 18 teams.

Teams finishing first and second in the regular season, plus one team winning the playoff round from each division will be promoted to Lega Pro Prima Divisione.  The last three teams in the regular season, plus one relegation play-out loser from each division will be relegated to Serie D.  The two relegation play-out winners, one from each division, will play each other and the loser will become the ninth team relegated. In all, six teams will be promoted to Lega Pro Prima Divisione, and nine teams will be relegated to Serie D.

Girone A

Teams
Teams from Aosta Valley, Emilia-Romagna, Liguria, Lombardy, Piedmont, Sicily & Veneto

League table

Promotion Playoffs

Semifinals
First legs scheduled 26 May 2013; return legs scheduled 1, 2 June 2013

Final
First leg scheduled 9 June 2013; return leg scheduled 16 June 2013

Girone B

Teams
Teams from Abruzzo, Apulia, Basilicata, Calabria, Campania, Lazio, Molise, Tuscany & Umbria

League table

Promotion Playoffs

Semifinals
First legs scheduled 26 May 2013; return legs scheduled 2 June 2013

Final
First leg scheduled 9 June 2013; return leg scheduled 16 June 2013

Relegation play-off
only Finals winner is saved from relegation
other 3 teams are relegated to Serie D

Semifinals

Girone A 
First legs scheduled 26 May 2013; return legs scheduled 2 June 2013

Vallée d’Aoste relegated to Serie D

Girone B 
First legs scheduled 26 May 2013; return legs scheduled 2 June 2013

HinterReggio relegated to Serie D

Final 
First leg scheduled 9 June 2012; return leg scheduled 16 June 2012

Gavorrano relegated to Serie D

References

Lega Pro Seconda Divisione seasons
Italy
4